Auritibicen is a genus of cicadas from East Asia and Russia. The genus was first described in 2015.

Species
The following species are members of Auritibicen:

 Auritibicen aethus Wang, Hayashi & Wei, 2018
 Auritibicen atrofasciatus (Kirkaldy, 1909)
 Auritibicen bihamatus (de Motschulsky, 1861)
 Auritibicen chujoi (Esaki, 1935)
 Auritibicen curvatus Wang, Hayashi & Wei, 2018
 Auritibicen daoxianensis Wang, Hayashi & Wei, 2018
 Auritibicen esakii (Kato, 1958)
 Auritibicen flammatus (Distant, 1892)
 Auritibicen flavomarginatus (Hayashi, 1977)
 Auritibicen gracilis Wang, Hayashi & Wei, 2018
 Auritibicen intermedius (Mori, 1931)
 Auritibicen jai (Ouchi, 1938)
 Auritibicen japonicus (Kato, 1925)
 Auritibicen kyushyuensis (Kato, 1926)
 Auritibicen leechi (Distant, 1890)
 Auritibicen lijiangensis Wang, Hayashi & Wei, 2018
 Auritibicen pallidus Wang, Hayashi & Wei, 2018
 Auritibicen parvus Wang, Hayashi & Wei, 2018
 Auritibicen pekinensis (Haupt, 1924)
 Auritibicen purus Wang, Hayashi & Wei, 2018
 Auritibicen rotundus Wang, Hayashi & Wei, 2018
 Auritibicen septatus Wang, Hayashi & Wei, 2018
 Auritibicen shikokuanus (Kato, 1959)
 Auritibicen slocumi (K.F. Chen, 1943)
 Auritibicen tazawai (Kato, 1939)
 Auritibicen tsaopaonensis (K.F. Chen, 1943)

References

Cryptotympanini
Cicadidae genera